WindRider LLC is a United States manufacturer of sailing dinghy and trimaran sailboats.

As of late 2020 production of boats by WindRider LLC has ceased. The company now sells outdoor gear through their online store. 

Note that WindRider was the manufacturer of only the WindRider models listed below, all of which are rotomolded trimarans. Other models they have sold over the years, such as Astus and Lightning, they functioned solely as resellers or exclusive US Distributors.

Models
 JY15
 Lightning (dinghy)
 WindRider 10 ('Tango')
 WindRider 16
 WindRider 17
 WindRider Rave
 WindRider Rave V

External links
WindRider LLC website

References

WindRider LLC